Lieutenant-Colonel Guy Patrick Gilbert Crofton, 7th Baron Crofton (17 June 1951 – 25 November 2007) was an Irish Peer and British Army officer. He was commissioned into the 9th/12th Royal Lancers and served as a lieutenant-colonel and defence attaché to the British Embassy in Angola.

References

 Obituary can be read here: http://www.timesonline.co.uk/tol/comment/obituaries/article3154167.ece 

1951 births
2007 deaths
Barons in the Peerage of Ireland
Guy
9th/12th Royal Lancers officers
British military attachés